Carlos Hernández Vázquez (born August 14, 1983) is a Mexican producer who lived in Mexico City during most of the last decade of his career.

Early life
Carlos Hernández Vázquez was born on August 14, 1983 at the Lying-In Hospital in Celaya, Guanajuato. As a teenager, Hernández was interested in photography, and briefly attempted a career as a reporter. His parents sent him to live in México City in the hopes that it would help his academic growth.

Career
Hernández studied Independent filmmaking from 2001–2004, in Universidad Del Cine/AMCI. Lately attended Faculty of Law (UNAM) from 2003–2008. He earned a LL.B. from university in 2008.

During his working years, Hernández was particularly inspired by the film production process, and studied film production workshop at the Centro de Capacitación Cinematográfica.

Awards and recognition

Frequent collaborators
Hernández did on several occasions work with the same crew more than once. Erick García Corona (Film director), Oswaldo Toledano (Mexican cinematographer) and Axel Barba (location sound recordist) are frequent collaborators.

Filmography

References

External links 
 

1983 births
Living people
Mexican film directors
Mexican film producers
Mexican screenwriters
People from Mexico City
Spanish-language film directors